The Germany national under-21 football team represents the under-21s of Germany in the UEFA European Under-21 Football Championship and is controlled by the German Football Association (DFB), the governing body of football in Germany.

Before the reunification of Germany, East Germany and West Germany played as separate entities — the two teams played separately until summer 1990.  Following the realignment of UEFA's youth competitions in 1976, international under-21 football in Europe began. A West German team, however, did not compete in the U-21 European Championship until the qualifying round (beginning in 1980) of the 1982 competition.

West Germany competed in the first two under-23 competitions, which finished in 1972 and 1974. The first under-21 competition finals were in 1978, and since the under-21 competition rules state that players must be 21 or under at the start of a two-year competition, technically it is an under-23 competition.

The current Germany team can be legitimately considered as the current incarnation of the West German team, since the West Germany flag, uniform, and football association all became those of the unified Germany. In effect, the West German team absorbed the East German team to become 'the Germany national under-21 football team'.

For these reasons, the record of West Germany for the U-23 and U-21 competitions is shown below.

Competitive record
For the East Germany team record, look here.

1972–1990 as 
1994–present as 

 Champions   Runners-up   Third place   Fourth place

UEFA U-23 Championship record

UEFA U-21 Championship record

Individual awards
 Golden Player: Rudi Völler (1982)
 Silver Boot: Kevin Volland (2015)

EURO Under-21 dream team
On 17 June 2015, UEFA revealed an all-time best XI from the previous Under-21 final tournaments.

Included players from Germany:
 Goal: Manuel Neuer
 Defence: Mats Hummels
 Midfield: Mesut Özil

UEFA European Under-21 Football Championship

2023 UEFA European Under-21 Championship qualification

2023 UEFA European Under-21 Championship (Final tournament) group stage

Results and fixtures

Players

Current squad
Players born in or after 2000 are eligible for the 2023 UEFA European Under-21 Championship.

The following players were called up for the friendly matches matches against Japan and Romania on 24 and 28 March 2023.

Note: Names in italics denote players that have been called up to the senior team.

Caps and goals correct as of 19 November 2022.

Recent call-ups
The following players have previously been called up to the Germany under-21 squad in the last 12 months and remain eligible for selection.

Past squads
 1996 UEFA European Under-21 Championship
 1998 UEFA European Under-21 Championship
 2004 UEFA European Under-21 Championship
 2006 UEFA European Under-21 Championship
 2009 UEFA European Under-21 Championship
 2013 UEFA European Under-21 Championship
 2015 UEFA European Under-21 Championship
 2017 UEFA European Under-21 Championship
 2019 UEFA European Under-21 Championship
 2021 UEFA European Under-21 Championship

Player records

Most caps

Most goals

Former coaches
 Hannes Löhr (1990–2002)
 Jürgen Kohler (2002–2003)
 Uli Stielike (2003–2004)
 Dieter Eilts (2004–2008)
 Horst Hrubesch (2008–2009)
 Rainer Adrion (2009–2013)
 Horst Hrubesch (2013–2016)
 Stefan Kuntz (2016–2021)
 Antonio Di Salvo (2021–)

See also
 Germany national football team
 Germany national youth football team
 UEFA European Under-21 Football Championship

Notes

References

External links
Site of the Under-21 national team at the German Football Association homepage

 
European national under-21 association football teams
Youth football in Germany